Roland Nenaj (born 28 November 1978 in Vlorë) is an Albanian retired professional footballer who was the head coach of Bylis Ballsh.

References

1978 births
Living people
Footballers from Vlorë
Albanian footballers
Association football midfielders
Flamurtari Vlorë players
KF Bylis Ballsh players
KF Elbasani players
KF Himara players
Kategoria Superiore players
Albanian football managers
KF Bylis Ballsh managers